Hockey Bassano 1954 is a roller hockey team from Bassano del Grappa, Italy. It was founded in 1954 and later refounded in 2011 due to their financial struggle.

The biggest titles of the clubs are the CERS Cup won in the 2011–12 season and the 2006 Rink hockey World Club Championship.

Honours

National
Italian Championship: 2
 2003–04, 2008–09
Coppa Italia: 2
 1980–81, 2003–04
Italian Supercup: 2
 2008, 2010

International
CERS Cup: 1
2011–12
World Club Championship: 1
2006

External links
Official Website

Roller hockey clubs in Italy
Sports clubs established in 1954